Cloudy with a Chance of Meatballs (also known as Cloudy with a Chance of Meatballs: The Series) is an animated television series developed by Mark Evestaff and Alex Galatis for Cartoon Network and YTV. It is produced by DHX Media and Sony Pictures Animation in association with Corus. Based on the children's book and the film series of the same name, Cloudy is the first television series to be produced by Sony Pictures Animation and was animated using Toon Boom Harmony.

The series officially premiered in the United States on March 6, 2017, on Cartoon Network, with a sneak peek airing on February 20, 2017. After an unsuccessful run, the show moved to Boomerang's SVOD service, where it debuted on January 11, 2018. In Canada, the series was originally planned to air on Teletoon, but instead premiered on YTV on April 6, 2017. On February 2, 2018, DHX Media announced the series has been picked up for a second season.

The entire first season is available on Netflix in the United Kingdom, Europe and in the United States. On January 24, 2020, the show was removed from Boomerang's streaming service app.

Plot
The series is a prequel, featuring the high school years of Flint Lockwood, the eccentric young scientist in the films. In his adventures, he is joined by Sam Sparks, a new girl in town and the school's "wannabe" reporter, along with Flint's dad Tim, Steve the Monkey, Manny as the head of the school's audiovisual club (among other professions), Earl as a school gym teacher, Brent still riding on his fame as from the sardine commercial, and Mayor Shelbourne, who serves as the school principal, and who wins every Mayoral election on the pro-sardine platform.

The show clarifies that when Flint and Sam met in their adulthood in the first film, it was not their first meeting. They first met and became friends in high school. In the first episode, Flint says that if Sam ever has to move away from Swallow Falls, he will invent a memory eraser, as she had moved around frequently and did not want the memory of another lost friendship to sadden her.

Episodes

Cast
 Mark Edwards as:
 Flint Lockwood; an inventor. 
 Steve; Flint's pet vervet monkey who communicates using a Speak and Spell monkey thought translator Flint invented. 
 Katie Griffin as Sam Sparks; a weather intern from New York City and a reporter.
 David Berni as "Baby" Brent McHale; an infamous celebrity mascot of Baby Brent's Sardines.
 Seán Cullen as:
 Tim Lockwood; Flint's widowed father.
 Mayor Susan Shelbourne; the gluttonous and egotistical mayor of Swallow Falls.
 Old Rick; an elderly citizen in Swallow Falls.
 Patrick McKenna as:
 Gil; Mayor Shelbourne's neglected son
 Manny; Sam's Guatemalan cameraman and a former doctor, pilot, and comedian.
 Clé Bennett as Earl Devereaux; the town's athletic cop and Cal's dad.

Production
Sony Pictures Animation and Canadian family entertainment company DHX Media signed to co-produce the series in 2014, starting with twenty-six 22-minute episodes (fifty-two 11-minute segments). DHX Media handles the global television and non-U.S. home entertainment distribution, along with worldwide merchandising rights, while Sony distributes home entertainment in the United States. Turner Broadcasting System handles international distribution via Cartoon Network.

Broadcast
Boomerang (Latin America) premiered Cloudy with a Chance of Meatballs on May 12, 2017 with a broadcast of the first 4 episodes, for next Friday continue with recurring releases (double episode), meanwhile Cartoon Network (Latin America) premiered the series on May 18, 2017 premiering a new episode every Thursday. Cartoon Network Australia will premiere Cloudy with a Chance of Meatballs on September 2, 2017. In the United Kingdom and Ireland, the series was first broadcast on Cartoon Network on August 28, 2017 starting with the episode "Who You Callin’ Garbage!" (S1EP5). In France, the series started broadcast on Boing from September 2017; in the same period it started on Cartoon Network in Italy. In India, the series will premiere on Cartoon Network. The series began broadcasting on Disney Channel in Germany on 6 November 2017. New episodes began premiering on Boomerang's SVOD service in the United States in January 2018. Older episodes of the series are also available on Boomerang. On February 2, 2018, DHX Media announced the series has been picked up for a second season. On November 30, 2018, the show was made available for streaming on Netflix in the United States.

In August 2019, CBS All Access acquired the U.S. broadcast rights to the series, beginning with Season 2.

Home media
Region 1:
 Cloudy with a Chance of Meatballs: Swallow-een Falls Spooktacular! (October 10, 2017)
 Cloudy with a Chance of Meatballs: Lobster Claus is Coming to Town (October 31, 2017)

Reception

Critical response
Common Sense Media rated the show a three out of five stars stating "Cloudy with a Chance of Meatballs doesn't attempt to lead directly into the movies and in fact presents a major inconsistency for the later stories by introducing Sam to Flint during their teen years. Of course this is only a concern for those who have seen the chronologically later stories first; new viewers without a history with these characters won't have a problem and likely will want to follow up with the movies at some point. A big plus to the show? Even though the science often isn't realistic, the hero and heroine make nerdiness seem pretty cool."

Accolades

References

External links
 Official website at Sony Pictures Animation
 Official website at Corus Entertainment
 

Cloudy with a Chance of Meatballs (franchise)
2010s American animated television series
2010s American comic science fiction television series
2010s American high school television series
2017 American television series debuts
2018 American television series endings
2010s Canadian animated television series
2010s Canadian comic science fiction television series
2010s Canadian high school television series
2017 Canadian television series debuts
2018 Canadian television series endings
American children's animated comic science fiction television series
American children's animated science fantasy television series
American children's animated comedy television series
American prequel television series
American television shows based on children's books
Canadian children's animated comic science fiction television series
Canadian children's animated science fantasy television series
Canadian children's animated comedy television series
English-language television shows
YTV (Canadian TV channel) original programming
Cartoon Network original programming
Canadian television shows based on children's books
Animated television shows based on films
Television series based on adaptations
Television series by Corus Entertainment
Television series by DHX Media
Television series by Sony Pictures Animation
Television series by Sony Pictures Television
Teen animated television series